International Business College may refer to:
International Business College (Fort Wayne, Indiana)
International Business College (Indianapolis)
International Business College (El Paso, Texas)